Vaitarna Dam, also called Modaksagar Dam, is a Gravity dams on Vaitarna river which supplies water to Palghar, Mumbai, but located in Palghar & Nashik district in the state of Maharashtra in India. It was opened in 1957.

Another dam, the Middle Vaitarna Dam is to be built in the neighboring Palghar & Thane district on the same river; to supplement the water supply to the ever-growing needs of Mumbai and its Mumbai Metropolitan Region.

Specifications

Purpose
 Water supply

See also
 Middle Vaitarna Dam
 Upper Vaitarana Dam
 Dams in Maharashtra
 List of reservoirs and dams in India

References

External links

Dams in Nashik district
Dams completed in 1957
1957 establishments in Bombay State